Beverly Lumbres Caimen (born June 20, 1994), known mononymously as Beverly (ビバリー), is a Filipino pop singer based in Japan under the Avex Trax label. She is known her various soundtrack appearances, such as "Be the One" in Kamen Rider Build and "Koko" in Pokémon the Movie: Secrets of the Jungle.

Early life

Beverly Caimen was born on June 20, 1994 in Calamba, Laguna, Philippines as the third child to Ramon Vega Caimen and Leticia Valdez Lumbres, having a brother and two other sisters.
Beverly began singing at the age of 5 when her mother sent her to school and found out she had a talent for it. She joined her school's choir at the age of 7 and began taking voice lessons at 9 when her mother found time. It was around this time she entered her first singing competition, but she didn't win. Even so, her mother encouraged her to continue as she needed more experience. She graduated from Batangas State University with a B.S. in Psychology.

History

Beverly began chasing after her dreams by joining various amateur singing competitions. She won first place at the World Championships of Performing Arts, where she recorded songs under GMA Records and worked with composer Vehnee Saturno; during this time, she released her first and only album with GMA, Beverly Caimen. Beverly received a Best Performance nomination from Awit Awards and won the Harvest of Honors award from the National Commission for Culture and the Arts and the Best Performance award from the A Song of Praise Music Festival Year 3.

Beverly had always loved Japanese music, having watched a lot of anime and Japanese dramas while in the Philippines. She had always wanted to travel to Japan, and when Saturno asked his business partner in Japan to give Beverly's songs a listen, they eventually came to audition her, and she got to do just that.

With Beverly finally in Japan in 2015, she attended singing and dancing workshops and signed with Avex Trax in 2016. At the annual A-Nation event, she was appointed as the 'Shooting Act', the name to look out for, for an up-and-coming artist. The reaction she received was very positive, which lead to her being included in the Disney Magical Pop Christmas album. She also opened for Ariana Grande on her Dangerous Woman Tour on October 10, 2017 at Makuhari Messa.

Beverly's big break came when her song "I Need Your Love" was used in the Fuji TV drama Crisis starring Oguri Shun and Nishijima Hidetoshi. The music video garnered more than five million views and topped download platforms like iTunes and Recochoku in Japan.

Beverly released her debut album, Awesome, on May 31, 2017. It peaked at No. 8 on the Oricon Albums Chart, and is her highest ranking release to date.

Beverly released her second album, 24, on June 20, 2018. It includes the singles "All I Want" and "Love Therapy". The album reached No. 16 on the Oricon Albums Chart and charted for a total of six weeks.

Beverly released her third album, Infinity, on December 4, 2019. It includes the singles "Adventure," "Again," and "Sagashi ni Ikoyo." The album peaked at No. 58 on the Oricon Albums Chart.

She released her fourth Japanese album, From JPN, on June 17, 2022. It's a double album, with one disc containing songs in English and the other disc containing Japanese versions. It peaked at No. 148 on the Oricon Albums Chart.

Discography

Albums

Studio albums

Mini albums

Singles

Soundtrack appearances

Compilation appearances

As featured artist

Notes

References 

1994 births
Living people
Filipino women pop singers
Singers from Laguna (province)
People from Calamba, Laguna
Filipino expatriates in Japan
Avex Trax artists